Ignelater is a genus of click beetle (family Elateridae). They are one of several genera in the tribe Pyrophorini, all of which are bioluminescent. Most of the species were formerly in the genus Pyrophorus.

List of species
 Ignelater brunneus
 Ignelater caudatus
 Ignelater dominicanensis
 Ignelater glaesum
 Ignelater havaniensis
 Ignelater inaguensis
 Ignelater luminosus
 Ignelater novoae
 Ignelater paveli
 Ignelater phosphoreus

References

External links

Elateridae genera
Bioluminescent insects